De Heuvel is a hamlet in the Dutch province of North Brabant. It is located in the municipality of Waalre, on the north side of the town of Waalre.

References

Populated places in North Brabant
Waalre